American River Ski Bowl was an alpine ski area that operated in Washington state between 1935 and 1959.

Located 19 miles east of Chinook Pass, the ski area had a base elevation of 3,100 ft and a peak elevation of 3,600 ft above sea level serviced by two rope tows.

References

Defunct ski areas and resorts in Washington (state)
Ski areas and resorts in Washington (state)
Cascade Range
Buildings and structures in Yakima County, Washington
1935 establishments in Washington (state)
1959 disestablishments in Washington (state)